Mesembria was an important Greek city in ancient Thrace. It was situated on the coast of the Euxine and at the foot of Mount Haemus; consequently upon the confines of Moesia, in which it is placed by Ptolemy. Strabo relates that it was a colony of Dorians from Megara, and that it was originally called Menebria (Μενεβρία) after its founder Menas; Stephanus of Byzantium says that its original name was Melsembria (Μελσημβρία), from its founder Melsas; and both writers state that the termination -bria was the Thracian word for town. According to the Anonymous Periplus of the Euxine Sea, Mesembria was founded by Chalcedonians at the time of the expedition of Darius against Scythia; but according to Herodotus it was founded a little later, after the suppression of the Ionic Revolt, by fugitives from Byzantium and Chalcedon. These statements may, however, be reconciled by supposing that the Thracian town was originally colonized by Megarians, and afterwards received additional colonists from Byzantium and Chalcedon. Mesembria was one of the cities, forming the Greek Pentapolis on the Euxine, the other four being Odessus, Tomi, Istriani and Apolloniatae. Mesembria is rarely mentioned in history, but it continued to exist till a late period, being recorded by Pomponius Mela, Pliny the Elder, and Ptolemy, and appearing in the Peutinger Table. The Dorian colonisation is dated to the beginning of the 6th century BCE, and evidence shows that it was an important trading centre from then on and a rival of Apollonia (Sozopol). It remained the only Dorian colony along the Black Sea coast, as the rest were typical Ionian colonies. At 425/4 BCE the town joined the Delian League, under the leadership of Athens.

Archaeology

Bulgarian archaeologist Lyuba Ognenova-Marinova led six underwater archaeological expeditions for the Bulgarian Academy of Sciences (BAS) between 1961 and 1972 in the waters along the Bulgarian Black Sea Coast. Her work led to the identification of five chronological periods of urbanization on the peninsula surrounding Nesebar through the end of the second millennium BCE, which included the Thracian protopolis, the Greek colony Mesambria, a Roman-ruled village to the Early Christian Era, the Medieval settlement and a Renaissance era town, known as Mesemvria or Nessebar.

Remains date mostly from the Hellenistic period and include the acropolis, a temple of Apollo and an agora. A wall which formed part of the Thracian fortifications can still be seen on the north side of the peninsula.

Bronze and silver coins were minted in the city since the 5th century BCE and gold coins since the 3rd century BCE. The town fell under Roman rule in 71 BCE, yet continued to enjoy privileges such as the right to mint its own coinage.

Famous Landmarks
 Basilica of St. Sofia 
 Basilica of Holy Mother of God Eleusa
 Late Antique Baths
 Church of St. Demetrios
 Church of St. Stephen
 Church of the Archangels
 Church of St. John the Baptist
 Church of St. Theodore
 Church of Christ Pantokrator
 Church of St. Paraskeva
 Church of St. John Aliturgetos
 Nesebar Archaeological Museum

References

Further reading
 Krzysztof Nawotka. "Melsas, the Founder of Mesambria?". In: Hermes 122, no. 3 (1994): 320–26. http://www.jstor.org/stable/4477024.

Ionian colonies in Thrace
Populated places in ancient Thrace
Megarian colonies in Thrace
Archaeological sites in Bulgaria
Members of the Delian League
History of Burgas Province
Nesebar
Greek colonies in Thrace